Yukishige is a masculine Japanese given name.

Possible writings
Yukishige can be written using different combinations of kanji characters. Examples: 

幸重, "happiness, heavy"
幸茂, "happiness, luxuriant"
幸繁, "happiness, prosperous"
行重, "to go, heavy"
行茂, "to go, luxuriant"
行繁, "to go, prosperous"
之重, "of, heavy"
之茂, "of, luxuriant"
之繁, "of, prosperous"
志重, "determination, heavy"
志茂, "determination, luxuriant"
志繁, "determination, prosperous"
恭重, "respectful, heavy"
潔重, "pure, heavy"
雪重, "snow, heavy"

The name can also be written in hiragana ゆきしげ or katakana ユキシゲ.

Notable people with the name

, Japanese politician
, Japanese long jumper

Japanese masculine given names